Lanzarote is a Spanish island, the easternmost of the Canary Islands in the Atlantic Ocean. Covering , Lanzarote is the fourth-largest of the islands in the archipelago. With 152,289 inhabitants at the start of 2019, it is the third most populous Canary Island, after Tenerife and Gran Canaria. Located in the centre-west of the island is Timanfaya National Park, one of its main attractions. The island was declared a biosphere reserve by UNESCO in 1993. The island's capital is Arrecife, which lies on the eastern coastline. It is the smaller main island of the Province of Las Palmas.

The first recorded name for the island, given by Italian-Majorcan cartographer Angelino Dulcert, was Insula de Lanzarotus Marocelus, after the Genoese navigator Lancelotto Malocello, from which the modern name is derived. The island's name in the native Guanche language was Tyterogaka or Tytheroygaka, which may mean "one that is all ochre" (referring to the island's predominant colour).

Geography
Its landscape includes the mountain ranges of Famara in the north and Ajaches to the south. South of the Famara massif is the El Jable desert, which separates Famara and Montañas del Fuego. The "Tunnel of Atlantis", the largest underwater volcanic tunnel in the world, is part of the Cueva de los Verdes lava tube.

Climate
Often called the "Island of Eternal Spring", Lanzarote has a subtropical-desert climate (BWh) according to the Köppen climatic classification. The small amount of precipitation is mainly concentrated in the winter. Rainfall during summer is a rare phenomenon and very often summers are completely dry without any precipitation. On average the island receives approximately 16 days of precipitation between December and February. Sometimes, the hot sirocco wind prevails, causing dry and dusty conditions across the island.

Geology

Lanzarote is the northernmost and easternmost island of the Canary Islands and has a volcanic origin.  The island emerged about 15 million years ago as product of the Canary hotspot. The island, along with others, emerged after the breakup of the African and the American continental plates. The greatest recorded eruptions occurred between 1730 and 1736 in the area now designated Timanfaya National Park.

Biodiversity

Plants
There are five hundred different kinds of plants on the island, of which 17 species are endemic. These plants have adapted to the relative scarcity of water in the same way as succulents. They include the Canary Island date palm (Phoenix canariensis), which is found in damper areas of the north, the Canary Island pine (Pinus canariensis), ferns, and wild olive trees (Olea europaea). Laurisilva trees, which once covered the highest parts of Risco de Famara, are rarely found today. After winter rainfall, the vegetation comes to a colourful bloom between February and March.

The vineyards of La Gería, Lanzarote DO wine region, are a protected area. This agricultural technique is designed to harvest rainfall and overnight dew and to protect the plants from the winds.

Fungi
There are 180 different species of lichen-forming fungi. These survive in the suitable areas like rock surfaces, and promote weathering.

Animals
Apart from the native bats and the mammals which accompanied humans to the island (including the dromedary, which was used for agriculture and is now a tourist attraction), there are few vertebrate species on Lanzarote. These include birds (such as falcons) and reptiles. Some interesting endemic animals are the Gallotia lizards and the blind Munidopsis polymorpha crabs found in the Jameos del Agua lagoon, which was formed by a volcanic eruption. The island is also home to one of two surviving populations of the threatened Canarian Egyptian vulture.

Natural symbols 

The official natural symbols associated with Lanzarote are Munidopsis polymorpha (Blind crab) and Euphorbia balsamifera (Tabaiba dulce).

Demographics and administration

,  people live on Lanzarote, an increase of 9.163% from 2008. According to the 2011 census, the majority of the inhabitants are Spanish (72.1%) with a sizeable number of residents of other nationalities, notably Britons (5.6%), Colombians (3.2%), Germans (3.1%) and Moroccans (3.1%). Other populous groups include Italians, Koreans, Cubans, and Romanians, which constitute a large proportion of the remaining 12.9% of the population.

The island has an international airport, César Manrique-Lanzarote Airport, through which  passengers travelled in 2018. Tourism has been the mainstay of the island's economy for over 40 years, the only other industry being agriculture.

Lanzarote is part of the province of Las Palmas, and is divided into seven municipalities:

Transport

Air
The island's main point of entry is César Manrique-Lanzarote Airport which, in 2018, handled  passengers. It was renamed in 2019 to include the name of local artist César Manrique, in honour of the legacy he left behind on the island and coinciding with the centenary of his birth. The airport has two passenger terminal buildings, T1 and T2, with T2 being used exclusively for inter-island flights to and from the other Canary Islands. These inter-island flights are operated by regional airlines Binter Canarias and Canaryfly.

Sea
Most of the goods arrive by sea through the Port of Arrecife, Puerto de los Mármoles. This port is also used by cruise ships.

Furthermore, there are regular ferry lines that connect the Port of Arrecife with Las Palmas de Gran Canaria, Santa Cruz de Tenerife and Cadiz.

Ferry services to the neighbouring island of Fuerteventura depart from Playa Blanca, the island's southernmost town.

The two main companies operating these services are Fred Olsen Express and Naviera Armas.

Ferries to the island of La Graciosa depart from Órzola, Lanzarote's northernmost town.

Road
The LZ-1 road connects the capital, Arrecife, to the northernmost town of Órzola. The LZ-2 road connects Arrecife to the southernmost town of Playa Blanca. LZ-3 is a highway that acts as a ring road around Arrecife, connecting Puerto de los Mármoles on the northern side of the city to LZ-2 on the southern side. These three roads form the island's central road axis from which other roads connect to the rest of the island's towns, settlements and points of interest.

Public transport on the island is provided by Arrecife Bus, operating under the name of Intercity Bus Lanzarote. The company operates 30 bus lines connecting the island's major and minor settlements, as well as serving the airport, and includes internal bus services in the towns of Playa Blanca, San Bartolomé and Tías. Most lines begin or end in the capital, Arrecife. The public bus service within the city of Arrecife is provided by the local council and consists of five lines, including one to the neighbouring town of Playa Honda.

History

Lanzarote is believed to have been the first Canary Island to be settled. The Phoenicians may have visited or settled there, though no material evidence survives. The first known record came from Roman author Pliny the Elder in the encyclopaedia Naturalis Historia on an expedition to the Canary Islands. The names of the islands (then called Insulae Fortunatae or the "Fortunate Isles") were recorded as Junonia (Fuerteventura), Canaria (Gran Canaria), Ninguaria (Tenerife), Junonia Major (La Palma), Pluvialia (El Hierro), and Capraria (La Gomera). Lanzarote and Fuerteventura, the two easternmost Canary Islands, were only mentioned as the archipelago of the "purple islands". The Roman poet Lucan and the Greek astronomer and geographer Ptolemy gave their precise locations. It was settled by the Majos tribe of the Guanches. After the fall of the Western Roman Empire, interaction with the Canary Islands is unrecorded before 999, when the Arabs arrived at the island which they dubbed al-Djezir al-Khalida (among other names).

In 1336, a ship arrived from Lisbon under the guidance of Genoese navigator Lancelotto Malocello, who used the alias "Lanzarote da Framqua". A fort was later built in the area of Montaña de Guanapay near today's Teguise. Castilian slaving expeditions in 1385 and 1393 seized hundreds of Guanches and sold them in Spain, initiating the slave trade in the islands. French explorer Jean de Béthencourt arrived in 1402, heading a private expedition under Castilian auspices. Bethencourt first visited the south of Lanzarote at Playas de Papagayo, and the French overran the island within a matter of months. The island lacked mountains and gorges to serve as hideouts for the remaining Guanche population, and so many Guanches were taken away as slaves that only 300 Guanche men were said to have remained.

At the southern end of the Yaiza municipality, the first European settlement in the Canary Islands appeared in 1402 in the area known as El Rubicón, where the conquest of the Archipelago began. In this place, the Cathedral of Saint Martial of Limoges was built. The cathedral was destroyed by English pirates in the 16th century. A diocese was moved in 1483 to Las Palmas de Gran Canaria (Roman Catholic Diocese of Canarias). In 1404, the Castilians (with the support of the King of Castile) came and fought the local Guanches, who were further decimated. The islands of Fuerteventura and El Hierro were later similarly conquered. In 1477, a decision by the royal council of Castile confirmed a grant of Lanzarote and Fuerteventura, with the smaller islands of Ferro and Gomera to the Castilian nobles Herrera, who held their fief until the end of the 18th century. In 1585, the Ottoman admiral Murat Reis temporarily seized Lanzarote. In the 17th century, pirates raided the island and took 1,000 inhabitants into slavery in Cueva de los Verdes.

Lanzarote and Fuerteventura would be the main exporters of wheat and cereals to the central islands of the archipelago during the 16th, 17th and 18th centuries; Tenerife and Gran Canaria. Although this trade was almost never reversed for the inhabitants of Lanzarote and Fuerteventura (due to the fact that the landowners of these islands profited from this activity), producing periods of famine, so the population of these islands had to travel to Tenerife and Gran Canaria. The island of Tenerife is a major focus of attraction for the inhabitants of Lanzarote and Fuerteventura, hence the feeling of union that has always existed in the popular sphere with Tenerife.

The priest of Yaiza, Don Andrés Lorenzo Curbelo, documented the eruption in detail until 1731. Lava covered a quarter of the island's surface, including the most fertile soil and 11 villages. 100 smaller volcanoes were located in the area called Montañas del Fuego, the "Mountains of Fire". In 1768, drought affected the deforested island, and winter rains did not fall. Much of the population was forced to emigrate to Cuba and the Americas, including a group which formed a significant addition to the Spanish settlers in Texas at San Antonio de Bexar in 1731. Another volcanic eruption occurred within the range of Tiagua in 1824, which was less violent than the major eruption between 1730 and 1736.

In 1927, Lanzarote and Fuerteventura became part of the province of Las Palmas. Several archaeological expeditions have uncovered the prehistoric settlement at the archaeologic site of El Bebedero in the village of Teguise. In one of those expeditions, by a team from the University of Las Palmas de Gran Canaria and a team from the University of Zaragoza, yielded about 100 Roman potsherds, nine pieces of metal, and one piece of glass. The artefacts were found in strata dated between the 1st and 4th centuries. They show that Romans did trade with the Canarians, though there is no evidence of settlements.

The island has a UNESCO Biosphere Reserve protected site status. According to a report in the Financial Times, this status was endangered by a local corruption scandal. Since May 2009, police have arrested the former president of Lanzarote, the former mayor of Arrecife and more than 20 politicians and businessmen in connection with illegal building permits along Lanzarote's coastline. UNESCO has threatened to revoke Lanzarote's Biosphere Reserve status, "if the developments are not respecting local needs and are impacting on the environment". The President of the Cabildo of Lanzarote denied "any threat to Lanzarote's UNESCO status".

Notable people
 Juan Leal (1676–1742/1743), Spanish settler and politician, born on the island, 1st mayor of San Antonio
 Juan Curbelo (1680–1760), Spanish politician, born on the island, Alcalde (mayor) of San Antonio de Bexar, Texas (1737, 1739)
 Salvador Rodríguez (1688–unknown), Spanish politician, born on the island, Regidor (council member) of San Antonio de Bexar, Texas
 José Clavijo y Fajardo (1726–1806), Spanish journalist, born on the island
 Blas Cabrera Felipe (1878–1945), Spanish physicist, born on the island
 César Manrique (1919–1992), Spanish artist, born and died on the island
 José Saramago (1922–2010), Portuguese writer, resided and died on the island
 Manuel Medina (born 1935), Spanish politician, born on the island
 Rosana Arbelo (born 1963), Spanish singer, born on the island
 Princess Alexia of Greece and Denmark (born 1965), Greek royalty, resides on the island
 Goya Toledo (born 1969), Spanish actress and model, born on the island
 Carlos Morales Quintana (born 1970), Spanish architect and husband of Princess Alexia, born and resides on the island
 Jonathan Pérez Olivero (born 1982), Spanish footballer, born on the island
 Patricia Díaz Perea (born 1984), Spanish triathlete, represents Lanzarote-based club Triatlón Titanes
 Jordi Martín (born 1991), Spanish footballer, born on the island

Festivals
The most established festival on the island is held each year on 15 September in the village of Mancha Blanca, in honour of Our Lady of Dolours (Virgen de los Dolores), also called the "Virgin of the Volcanoes" (the Patron Saint of Lanzarote). People from all over the island participate in this pilgrimage, mostly dressed in traditional costumes.

Sport
The island's only professional football team is UD Lanzarote, founded in 1970 who play at the 7,000 capacity Ciudad Deportiva de Lanzarote. The  island is also home to smaller clubs CD Teguise and CD Orientación Marítima. In tennis, the Open Isla de Lanzarote was hosted between 2006 and 2008.

Views

References

Further reading 

 
 
 
  a fiction thriller set entirely on the island.

External links

 Official tourism site of Lanzarote
 Map of Lanzarote with all the architectural works from César Manrique
 Lanzarote, the Land of Volcanos
 
 
 

 
Biosphere reserves of Spain
Eocene volcanoes
Fissure vents
Islands of the Canary Islands
Miocene volcanoes
Oligocene volcanoes
Pleistocene volcanoes
Pliocene volcanoes
Potentially active volcanoes
Protected areas of the Canary Islands
Seaside resorts in Spain
Tourism in Spain
Volcanoes of the Canary Islands